St. Isidore is a hamlet in northwest Alberta, Canada within Northern Sunrise County. St. Isidore is flanked by deep ravines cut by Pat's Creek to the north and Pat's Creek tributary to the south. The ravines are surrounded by pine forests.

In 2007, the St. Isidore Development Committee organized the St. Isidore Cultural Marketing Project that involved a lot reservation draw. There were eight applicants for the sixteen lots that were made available in the southeast end of the community.

History 
The Hamlet of St. Isidore is named after St. Isidore, a patron saint of farm workers who was known to be a model worker. It was founded in 1953 by seven families from the Saguenay-Lac-Saint-Jean region of Quebec. The group was aided by the Union des Cultivateurs Catholiques (Group of Catholic Farmers) of Saguenay-Lac-Saint-Jean Quebec, a rural agricultural organization that promoted a cooperative approach to agriculture and rural living.  Being the last community to be settled in a wave of migration from Quebec after the Second World War, it has managed to maintain much of its original cultural vibrancy. Over half a century later, the community still reflects the cultural, cooperative, and family spirit at the heart of this community.

Demographics 

Culture 
During the third weekend of February each year, the hamlet hosts the Carnaval de St. Isidore in and around the St. Isidore Cultural Centre.  Modeled after the Quebec Winter Carnival, this event celebrates the community's French-Canadian heritage through a variety of events while retaining the Albertan nature of the surrounding French communities. Among the major events is the snow sculpting competition in which the organizers, the St. Isidore Cultural Centre sets a theme for the sculpting. There have been many great themes over the years: Asterix & Obelix, Super Z’héros, Tropical, Orange, Western and Vegas for the 30th edition in 2012. In addition to the professional category, the snow sculpting event also includes amateur and youth categories.

The Carnaval also features a mixture of traditional French folk and contemporary music, local talent, traditional French cooking, sleigh rides, log sawing and other Franco-Canadian activities.

Carnaval de St. Isidore crowns the "ducs" et duchesses" (its teenaged volunteers) King and Queen  of the Carnaval. The volunteers are required to sell tickets in order to be entered into a draw that crowns the King and Queen.

Amenities 
St. Isidore offers a large number of services to residents and tourists, including: the St. Isidore Co-op, a library, le Conseil Scolaire du Nord-Ouest, St. Isidore Housing Cooperative, le Domaine des aînés (seniors residence), la Société des Compagnons, le Club du Bon Temps, le Club Barbar, the Weavers' Guild, a cultural centre, dance troupe Plein Soleil, St. Isidore Museum, Family Community Support Services, a summer camp, a skating rink, and a Catholic church.

The roads in St. Isidore are both numbered and named, with avenues running east/west and streets (rues) running north–south.

Economy 
The economy of St. Isidore is predominantly agricultural in nature. Entreprises Macay is a family farming business that runs a Timothy hay drying and processing operation for export to Asian markets. There are beekeeping operations as well as dairy farming, both of which employ mostly seasonal workers. Residents of the hamlet also work in the nearby DMI Peace River Pulp Mill, Shell Peace River Complex, and the Town of Peace River.

See also 
List of communities in Alberta
List of designated places in Alberta
List of hamlets in Alberta

References

External links 
 Hamlet of St. Isidore
 Discover the Peace Country Visitors Guide – St. Isidore

Designated places in Alberta
Hamlets in Alberta
Northern Sunrise County